The 1995 Segunda División de Chile was the 44th season of the Segunda División de Chile.

Santiago Wanderers was the tournament's champion.

Aggregate table

Promotion/relegation play-offs

Regional Atacama and Huachipato stayed in the Primera División Chilena

See also
Chilean football league system

References

External links
 RSSSF 1995

Segunda División de Chile (1952–1995) seasons
Primera B
1995 in South American football leagues